Ian Reid is a male British former sports shooter.

Sports shooting career
Reid represented England and won a gold medal in the 10 metres air pistol pairs with Paul Leatherdale, at the 1986 Commonwealth Games in Edinburgh, Scotland.

References

Living people
British male sport shooters
Shooters at the 1986 Commonwealth Games
Commonwealth Games medallists in shooting
Commonwealth Games gold medallists for England
Year of birth missing (living people)
20th-century British people
Medallists at the 1986 Commonwealth Games